Laura Piranesi (1754–1789) was an Italian etcher working in Rome towards the end of the 18th century. She was an active participant in her family's print workshop, run by her father Giovanni Battista Piranesi, an Italian artist, etcher, and antiquarian. Participating in the veduta genre, Laura's prints consist of stylized views of Roman architecture and ruins that aim to capture the spirit of the city through landscapes. Vedute and architectural prints were particularly popular among travelers participating in the Grand Tour, and as Laura lived and worked during the height of the Grand Tour, her prints catered to the souvenir market. Her use of chiaroscuro and free-flowing lines reflect the rising popularity of Romanticism, which prioritizes emotion over accuracy.

Her life and career has long been overshadowed by her father, Giovanni Battista Piranesi, and brother, Francesco Piranesi.

Biography 
Laura Piranesi was born in Rome in 1754. The eldest of five Piranesi children, Laura had four younger siblings:  Francesco Piranesi (1758/59-1810), Angelo Piranesi (1763-1782), Anna Maria Rosalia Piranesi (b. 1766-?), and Pietro Piranesi (1773-?). Laura and her brothers were trained by their father in the family craft of etching; it is unknown whether Anna Maria, who entered the Bambin-Gesù on Via Urbana in 1783, was trained in etching.  Well-educated, Laura could write in Latin.

On November 9, 1778 Giovanni Battista Piranesi passed away, sending his family into legal and financial turmoil. Though Laura was the eldest child, inheritance laws in 18th-century Rome dictated that the workshop was to be inherited by the next male heir, Francesco Piranesi. Not only was the workshop in Francesco's hands, but Laura and her youngest siblings were under his guardianship as well; within three days of Giovanni Battista's death, Francesco drew up an initial dowry contract for Laura's betrothal to carpenter Giuseppe Svezzeman. In May of 1779, a final contract was agreed upon and her dowry was used by Svezzeman to open three financially unsuccessful shops in Rome.

In 1780, Laura and Giuseppe had a daughter, Luisa Clara Maria Gertrude Fortunata Svezzeman. Over the next decade, debt and ill-health followed the family, involving the couple in numerous court trials.

Laura is now known to have been alive in 1789, though scholarship previously thought her to have died by 1785. She was certainly dead by 1799, when the remaining Piranesi family members fled to Paris following the collapse of the Roman Republic.

Career and Reception 
In an era when it was rare for a woman to produce art professionally, Laura is a rare example of a female artist creating for a specific and viable market. In addition, Laura played a role in managing the family workshop – written sales records and inventories of her father's prints exist in Laura's hand, helping modern scholars to date his prints.

Laura's prints are undated, making it uncertain when she produced her prints, and whether she produced them before or after her father's death.

Laura's prints have been largely neglected by historians as nearly all are reinterpretations of her father's etchings. Labelled as copies, art historians from the 18th century to today have overlooked the unique aspects of Laura's work. In the 1920s, however, the Keeper of Prints and Drawings at the British Museum, Arthur Mayger Hind took an interest in Laura's prints when the museum acquired 20 prints by her. Hind recognized a liberty of design and unique style in Laura's prints. Due to the delicate nature of paper, many of Laura's prints have been lost, damaged, or destroyed.

Notable collections

Veduta del Tempio di Antonino, oggi Dogana di Terra (View of the Temple of Antoninus, now the Land Customs Office), 19th century, Fine Arts Museums of San Francisco
Vedute di Roma, 1750-1785, British Museum. A collection 20 prints.

Gallery

References

1754 births
1789 deaths
18th-century Italian artists
18th-century Italian women artists
Italian engravers
Italian etchers
Women engravers
Women etchers
18th-century engravers